Time River is a studio album by Miho Hazama and her chamber orchestra m_unit, released in September 2015.

Background
"Under the Same Moon" was originally composed when Miho Hazama was around twenty years old. When Miho was introduced from Gil Goldstein about his video of accordion quartet via email, she noticed and felt similarity. Then she decided to rearrange "Under the Same Moon" for Gil and m_unit, her bigband. Gil was invited as a guest player.

In the title track "Time River", the another guest, Joshua Redman is playing.

At the end of this album, a track of American rock supergroup A Perfect Circle, "Magdalena", is included. Miho Hazama had been playing tracks of A Perfect Circle in her cover band, when she was a senior high school student, and her favorite track was "The Hollow" in album Mer de Noms. She had been decided to conclude this album Time River by bright tone track "Magdalena" from Mer de Noms, after long journey of minor tracks.

Track listing
All compositions by Miho Hazama except as indicated.
"The Urban Legend" – 7:59
"Cityscape" – 7:10
"Under the Same Moon" – 8:21
"Dizzy Dizzy Wildflower" – 8:46
"Alternate Universe, Was That Real?" – 3:14
"Introduction" – 2:59
"Fugue" – 6:00
"Time River" – 10:26
"Magdalena" (Billy Howerdel and Maynard James Keenan) – 6:38

Personnel

Miho Hazama – conductor, piano (tracks: 6, 7)
Matthew Jodrell – trumpet, flugelhorn (tracks: 1 to 5, 8, 9)
Joshua Redman – soprano saxophone, tenor saxophone [guest] (track: 8)
Cam Collins – alto saxophone, clarinet (tracks: 1 to 5, 8, 9) 
Ryoji Ihara – tenor saxophone, soprano saxophone, flute (tracks: 1 to 5, 8, 9)
Andrew Gutauskas – baritone saxophone, bass clarinet (tracks: 1 to 5, 8, 9)
Adam Unsworth – French horn (tracks: 1 to 5, 8, 9)
Alex Brown – piano (tracks: 1, 3, 4, 9)
Sam Harris – piano (tracks: 2, 5, 8)
Gil Goldstein – accordion [guest] (track: 3)
James Shipp – vibraphone (tracks: 1 to 5, 8, 9)
Sam Anning – bass (tracks: 1 to 5, 8, 9)
Jake Goldbas – drums
Sara Caswell – violin
Joyce Hammann – violin
Meaghan Burke – cello
Lois Martin – viola

References

2015 albums
Miho Hazama albums
Sunnyside Records albums
Verve Records albums